Fabian Dwayne Reid (born 6 August 1991) is a Jamaican international footballer who plays for Dila Gori, as a midfielder.

Club career
Born in Kingston, Reid spent his early career with Boys' Town and Arnett Gardens, before moving to play for Trinidadian club San Juan Jabloteh. After two seasons abroad he returned to Arnett Gardens.

International career
Reid made his national team debut for Jamaica in 2017. By May 2018, Reid had scored 3 goals in 5 official and unofficial games for Jamaica.

International goals
Scores and results list Jamaica's goal tally first.

References

External links

1991 births
Living people
Jamaican footballers
Jamaica international footballers
Boys' Town F.C. players
Arnett Gardens F.C. players
San Juan Jabloteh F.C. players
Association football midfielders
Jamaican expatriate footballers
Jamaican expatriate sportspeople in Trinidad and Tobago
Expatriate footballers in Trinidad and Tobago
National Premier League players